Sishayi Simon Nxumalo (1936 – 25 February 2000) served as acting Prime Minister of Swaziland from 8 May 1996 to 26 July 1996. He was finance minister from 1983 to 1984. 

He was once leader of the Swaziland Democratic Party (SDP).

References

1936 births
2000 deaths
Prime Ministers of Eswatini
Finance Ministers of Eswatini